Thylaeodus semisurrectus is a species of sea snail, a marine gastropod mollusk in the family Vermetidae, the worm snails or worm shells.

Description

Distribution

References

External links
 Bivona-Bernardi Ant. (1832). Caratteri dei vermeti desunti da cinque specie che abitano nel mare di Palermo. Effemeride Scientifiche e Letterarie per la Sicilia 1: 59-62
 Aradas A. & Benoit L. (1872-1876). Conchigliologia vivente marina della Sicilia. Atti dell'Accademia Gioenia di Scienze Naturali. (3)6: 1-113 + pl. 1-2 [1872]; 113-226 + pl. 3-4 [1874]; 227-324 + pl. 5 [1876]
 Monterosato T. A. (di). (1892 [25 agosto]). Monografia dei Vermeti del Mediterraneo. Bullettino della Società Malacologica Italiana. 17: 7-48, pl. 1-7
  Keen M. (1961). A proposed reclassification of the gastropod family Vermetidae. Bulletin of the British Museum, Natural History (Zoology), 7(3): 183-213, pls. 54-55

Vermetidae
Gastropods described in 1832